A share taxi (also called shared taxi or taxibus) is a mode of transport which falls between a taxicab and a bus. These vehicles for hire are typically smaller than buses and usually take passengers on a fixed or semi-fixed route without timetables, but instead departing when all seats are filled. They may stop anywhere to pick up or drop off their passengers. Often found in developing countries, the vehicles used as share taxis range from four-seat cars to minibuses. They are often owner-operated.

In some terms share taxis can also be referred to as taxibuses since they play a role of taxis where the destination is selected by the rider as opposed to routed buses which travel on a route that is assigned by the transit operator.

Operation

Terminus
A given share taxi route may start and finish in fixed central locations, and landmarks may serve as route names or route termini. In some African cities routes are run between formal termini, where the majority of passengers board. In these places the share taxis wait for a full load of passengers prior to departing, and off-peak wait times may be in excess of an hour.

In other places there may be no formal termini, with taxis simply congregating at a central location, instead.

Even more formal terminals may be little more than parking lots.

In South Africa, the term "rank" denotes an area, specifically built for taxi operators by a municipality or city, where commuters may start and end their journey.

Along the route
Where they exist, share taxis provide service on set routes within and sometimes between towns.

After a share taxi has picked up passengers at its terminus, it proceeds along a semi-fixed route where the driver may determine the actual route within an area according to traffic condition. Drivers will stop anywhere to allow riders to disembark, and may sometimes do the same when prospective passengers want to ride.

Operational distinctions
While all share taxis share certain characteristics—and many regional versions exhibit peculiarities—some basic operational distinctions can be delineated.

Vehicle ownership
Most share taxis are operated under one of two regimes. Some share taxis are operated by a company. For example, in Dakar there are company-owned fleets of hundreds of car rapides. In the Soviet Union, share taxis, known as marshrutka, were operated by state-owned taxi parks.<ref>RAF-977DM marshrutnoye taksi, "Avtomobil Na Sluzhbie, No.28, DeAgostini, 2012,  (in Russian)</ref> There are also individual operators in many countries. In Africa, while there are company share taxis, individual owners are more common. Rarely owning more than two vehicles at a time, they will rent out a minibus to operators, who pay fuel and other running costs, and keep revenue.

Syndicates
In some places, like some African cities and also Hong Kong, share taxi minibuses are overseen by syndicates, unions, or route associations. These groups often function in the absence of a regulatory environment and may collect dues or fees from drivers (such as per-use terminal payments, sometimes illegally), set routes, manage terminals, and fix fares. Terminal management may include ensuring each vehicle leaves with a full load of passengers.

Because the syndicates represent owners, their regulatory efforts tend to favor operators rather than passengers, and the very termini syndicates upkeep can cost delays and money for passengers as well as forcing them to disembark at inconvenient locations, in a phenomenon called "terminal constraint".

Regulation
In Africa, regulation is mainly something that pertains to the vehicle itself not its operator or its mode of operation.

In Kenya, regulation does extend to operatorsNairobi Today: the Paradox of a Fragmented City; Hidden $ Centz: Rolling the Wheels of Nairobi Matatu. Mbugua wa-Mungai (p. 376).  edited by Helene Charton-Bigot, Deyssi Rodriguez-Torres. African Books Collective, 2010. 404 pp. 9987080936, 9789987080939. and mode of operation (such as routes used) as well as the vehicle.

As of 2008, African minibuses are difficult to tax, and may operate in a "regulatory vacuum" perhaps because their existence is not part of a government scheme, but is simply a market response to a growing demand for such services. Route syndicates and operator's associations often exercise unrestricted control, and existing rules may see little enforcement.

Types of vehicle
Share taxi is a unique mode of transport independent of vehicle type. Minibuses, midibuses, covered pickup trucks, station wagons, and lorries see use as share taxis.

Certain vehicle types may be better-suited to current condition than others. In many traffic-choked, sprawling, and low-density African cities minibuses profit.

In Israel they were mostly the largest model of Mercedes, owned generally by Arabs, and very efficient, having space for 7-8 people, and having loosely fixed routes, dropping a passenger either at a specific terminus or going a little out of the way to facilitate the passenger.

By country
While carrying different names and distinguished by regional peculiarities, the share taxi is an everyday feature of life in many places throughout the world.

Africa

Some Francophone African countries use the term  ('brush taxi', often spelled with a space rather than a hyphen in English) for share taxis.

 Algeria 

In Algeria, taxis collectifs ply fixed routes with their destination displayed. Rides are shared with others who are picked up along the way, and the taxi will leave only when it seats all the passengers it can. While stations, set locations to board and disembark, exist, prospective passengers flag down a taxi collectif when they want a ride.

Operating inter- and intra-city, taxis collectifs that travel between towns may be called interwilaya taxis.

Along with all forms of public transport in Algeria, the Foreign Affairs and International Trade Canada recommend against using these share taxis. The Irish Department of Foreign Affairs asks that you use taxis recommended by a hotel.

Burkina Faso
In Ouagadougou, capital of Burkina Faso, the share taxi or  role is not filled by the traditional African minibus.

Democratic Republic of the Congo
Those in Kinshasa, DRC, (or perhaps just the Kongo people) may call share taxis fula fula meaning "quick quick".

There was no independent transport authority in the city of Kinshasa as of 2008.

Cameroon
Share taxis do exist in Cameroon, but as of 2008 minibuses cannot be used for this purpose, by law. That same year, Douala, Cameroon, also was without an independent transport authority.

Egypt
The second name is used by Alexandrians.

Micro-buses are licensed by each governorate as taxicabs, and are generally operated privately by their drivers. Although each governorate attempts to maintain a consistent paint scheme for them, in practice the color of them varies wildly, as the "consistent" schemes have changed from time to time and many drivers have not bothered to repaint their cars.

Rates vary depending on distance traveled, although these rates are generally well known to those riding the micro-bus. The fares also depend on the city. Riders can typically hail micro-buses from any point along the route, often with well-established hand signals indicating the prospective rider's destination, although certain areas tend to be well-known micro-bus stops.

Like the Eastern European marshrutka, a typical micro-bus is a large van, most often a Toyota HiAce or its Jinbei equivalent, the Haise, and the latter is produced by the Bavarian Auto Manufacturing Group in 6th of October City in Egypt. Smaller vans and larger small buses are also used.

 Ethiopia 
Minibus taxis in Ethiopia are one of the most important modes of transport in big cities like Addis Ababa. They are preferred by the majority of the populace over public buses and more-traditional taxicabs because they are generally cheap, operate on diverse routes, and are available in abundance. All minibus taxis in Ethiopia have a standard blue-and-white coloring scheme, much as New York taxis are yellow. Minibus taxis are usually Toyota HiAces, frequent the streets. They typically can carry 11 passengers, but will always have room for another until that is no longer the case. The minibus driver has a crew member called a weyala whose job is to collect the fare from passengers.

In 2008, publicly operated public transport was available in Addis Ababa in addition to that provided by the minibuses. A fleet of 350 large buses may operate for this purpose, as such a number does exist. Also as of 2008, the city lacks an independent transport authority, but some regulation, such as that controlling market entry, does exist.

Route syndicates may be a presence but are described as "various".

Ghana

In Ghana and neighboring countries, tro tro are privately owned minibus vehicles for hire that travel fixed routes leaving when filled to capacity. While there are tro tro stations,West Africa (p. 347).  Anthony Ham. Lonely Planet, 2009. 7th ed. 912 pp. 1741048214, 9781741048216. these share taxis can also be boarded anywhere along the route.

Operated by a driver and a conductor, who collects money, shouts out the destination, and is called a "mate",TroTro Station  ghanaweb.com many are decorated with slogans and sayings, often religious, and few operate on Sundays.  Tro tro are used by 70% of Ghanaian commuters. This popularity may be because in cities such as Accra had only basic public transportation save for these small minibuses.  Following the creation of the Greater Accra Passenger Transport Executive, some large buses were brought into service, mainly Brazilian built Scanias with Marcopolo bodies. A Bus Rapid Transit system is being developed for opening in November 2019.  The Swedish company Scania has won the contract to not only supply the buses but also the infrastructure.

An informal means of transportation, in Ghana they are licensed by the government, but the industry is self-regulated. In Accra, syndicates include GPRTU and PROTOA.

Ivory Coast
In the Ivory Coast, gbaka is a name for minibus public transports.

The transport regulator in Abidjan, Ivory Coast, is Agence de Gestion des Transports Urbains or AGETU.

As of 2008, Abidjan public transport was serviced by large buses as well as minibuses.

Syndicates include UPETCA and SNTMVCI.

Kenya (matatu)

 Madagascar 

Mali

In Mali, at least two words for share taxi may have common currency sotrama and dourouni.

As of 2008, Bamako, Mali, has no independent transport authority, but share taxi activity could fall under regulator Direction de la régulation et du contrôle du transport urbain (municipal) or DRCTU control.

Morocco
In Morocco, grands taxis are the name for large, unmetered, shared taxicabs used for transportation between towns. Grands taxis are generally old full-size Mercedes-Benz sedans, and seat six or more passengers.

Nigeria

In Nigeria, both minibuses (called danfo) and midibuses (molue) may be operated as share taxis. Such forms of public transport may also be referred to as bolekaja, and many bear slogans or sayings.

Lagos, Nigeria, has a transport-dedicated regulator, Lagos Metropolitan
Area Transport Agency (LAMATA), its remit most probably includes share taxi activity. Outside of Lagos, most major cities in Africa have similar systems of transport.

Syndicates in Lagos may include National Union of Road and Transport Workers (NURTW).

Rwanda
Minibus public transports in Rwanda may be called coaster buses, share taxis, or twegerane. The latter could easily be a word meaning "stuffed" or "full".

As of 2020 in Kigali, Rwanda, syndicates include RFTC, Kigali Bus Services and Royal express, all of these operating in Kigali but each province has got a couple of companies operating there as well.

 South Africa 

Over 60% of South African commuters use shared minibus taxis (16 seater commuter buses), sometimes referred to as kombis.

Many of these vehicles are unsafe and not roadworthy, and often dangerously overloaded.

Prior to 1987, the taxi industry in South Africa was highly regulated and controlled. Black taxi operators were declined permits in the Apartheid era and all minibus taxi operations were, by their very nature, illegal.

Post 1987, the industry was rapidly deregulated, leading to an influx of new minibus taxi operators, keen to make money off the high demand for this service. Taxi operators banded together to form local and national associations. Because the industry was largely unregulated and the official regulating bodies corrupt, these associations soon engaged in anti-competitive price fixing and exhibited gangster tactics – including the hiring of hit-men and all-out gang warfare. During the height of the conflict, it was not uncommon for taxi drivers to carry shotguns and AK-47s to simply shoot rival taxi drivers and their passengers on sight.

Currently the South African Government is attempting to formalize and re-regulate the out-of-control minibus taxi industry. Along with new legislation, the government has instituted a 7-year recapitalization scheme to replace the old and un-roadworthy vehicles with new 18- and 35-seater minibuses. These new minibus taxis carry the South African flag on the side and are notably more spacious and safe.

Tanzania

Minivans (minibuses may be a more correct term here) are used as vehicles for hire and referred to as dala dala in Tanzania. While dala dala may run fixed routes picking up passengers at central locations, they will also stop along the route to drop someone off or allow a prospective passenger to board. Before minibuses became widely used, the typical dala dala was a pick-up truck with benches placed in the truck bed.

In Dar es Salaam, publicly operated minibus service may also exist as of 2008.

Usually run by both a driver and a conductor, the latter is called a mpigadebe, literally meaning "a person who hits a debe" (a 4-gallon tin container used for transporting gasoline or water). The name is in reference to the fact that conductors often hit the roof and side of the van to attract customers and to notify the driver when to leave the station.

These often-crowded public transports have their routes allocated by a Tanzania transport regulator, Surface and Marine Transport Regulatory Authority (SUMATRA), but syndicates also exist and include DARCOBOA.

Tunisia

Share taxis in Tunisia are called louage and follow fixed or semi-fixed routes, departing from stations when full. Usually minibuses or compact cars, although some louage are station wagons, passengers may board and disembark at any point during travel.

They run between towns and within cities.

West Africa - Kia kia
The term kia kia may be used in Yorùbáland to refer to minibus public transports, and means "quick quick".

Asia

 Hong Kong 

Public light buses, also known as minibus or maxicab, run the length and breadth of Hong Kong, through areas which the standard bus lines cannot or do not reach as frequently, quickly or directly.

Typically offering a faster and more efficient transportation solution due to their small size, limited carrying capacity, frequency and diverse range of routes, although they are generally slightly more expensive than standard buses, minibuses carry a maximum of 19 seated passengers. Standing passengers are not allowed.

There are two types of public light minibus, green and red. Both types have a cream-coloured body, the distinguishing feature being the colour of the external roof, and the type of service that the colour denotes: green is like regular transit bus with fixed number, route, schedule and fare (but generally not fixed stops); red is a shared taxi, operating on semi-fixed route unregulated, with the driver waiting for enough passengers to justify leaving, as his income depends on the revenue.

 Cyprus 
In Cyprus, there are privately owned share taxis that travel to set destinations and board additional passengers en route called service taxis.

India
Shared taxis have been operating in Mumbai, India, since the early 1970s. These are point-to-point services that operate during peak hours. During off-peak hours they ply like regular taxis; they can be hailed anywhere on the roads and passengers are charged by the meter. During peak hours they will take a full cab load of passengers to a more or less common destination. The pick-up points are usually fixed, and sometimes (but not always) marked by a sign saying "shared taxis". Cabs typically line up at this point during peak hours.

They sometimes display their general destination on their windscreens, and passengers get in and wait for the cab to fill up. Once full the cab moves off. Fares are fixed and much lower than the metered fare to the same destination, but higher than a bus or train fare.

Such informal arrangements also exist in other Indian cities. Share jeeps are a common form of transportation in the Himalayas, the North Eastern States and elsewhere.

IndonesiaAngkutan Kota, abbreviated as angkot, are share taxis in Indonesia widely operating throughout the country usually with microbuses. In some places there were also three-wheelers which are called bemo (such as autorickshaws based on the Daihatsu Midget) but phased out. The older version of Angkot is called oplet. The name of this transportation differs from each different province or area in the country. In Jakarta, it is called angkot or "mikrolet", in other parts such as in Sulawesi, the term mikrolet (shortened "mikro") is more widely used especially in Manado. In Makassar it is called "pete-pete", in Malang it is called "angkota", in Medan it is called "sudako", in Aceh it is called "labi-labi".

It runs accordingly with its exact routes and passengers can stop the van anywhere according to its destination, and is not required to stop at a bus stop or station.

Iran

In Iran a share taxi is usually called "taxi", while a non-share is called "ajans"/اژانس, pronounced [aʒans]. Four passengers share a taxi and sometimes there is no terminus and they wait in the street side and blare their destination to all taxies until one of them stops. These are regular taxies but if somebody wants to get a non-share taxi he can call for an ajans (taxi service) for himself or wait in the street side and say "Darbast" (which means non-share). It means he is not interested in sharing the taxi and is consequently willing to pay more for the privilege.

Minibuses, in the past years, with a capacity of 18 passengers, and nowadays van taxies, with a capacity of 10 passengers are other kinds of share transport in Iran.

Israel

In  monit sherut, pl.  moniyot sherut is a word meaning "service taxi". Referring to vans or minibusesAmelia Thomas, Michael Kohn, Miriam Raphael, Dan Savery Raz, Israel and the Palestinian Territories, p. 431.   Lonely Planet, 2010. 468 pp. 6th ed. 1741044561, 9781741044560. that serve as share taxis in Israel, these can be picked up from anywhere on their route. They follow fixed routes (sometimes the same routes as public transport buses) and usually leave from the initial station only when full.GUIDE TO 13 MAJOR WAY STATIONS  nytimes.com, March 4, 1984. Moniyot sherut operate both inter-INTERNATIONAL ISSUE; Going Abroad Without Going Broke  nytimes.com, March 11, 1990. and intra-city. Payment is often done by passing money to the driver in a "human chain" formed by the passengers seated before. The change (and the receipt, when requested) are returned to the person who paid by the same means. In intra-city routes, where they compete with official buses, the drivers usually coordinate their travel by radio so that they can arrive at the bus station just before public transport buses and take the most passengers.

Monit sherut are one of the only forms of transit accessible to many Israelis during Shabbat, as most public transportation in the country closes down between sunset on Friday and sunset on Saturday.

The Philippines

thumb|right|UV Express vehicle in Metro Manila

The most popular means of public transportation in the Philippines as of 2007, jeepneys were originally made out of US military jeeps left over from World War II and are known for their color and flamboyant decoration. Today the jeepneys are built by local body shops from a combination of prefabricated elements (from handful Filipino manufacturers) and improvisation and in most cases equipped with "surplus" or used Japanese SUV or light truck engines, drive train, suspension and steering components (from recycled vehicles in Japan).

They have not changed much since their post-war creation, even in the face of an increased access to pre-made vehicles, such as minibuses. However, due to the government's Public Utility Vehicle Modernization Program, Jeepneys and other modes of transportation must comply to the newer Philippine National Standards which is more compliant with international standards.

Older jeepneys have the entrance on the back, and there is space for two people beside the driver (or more if they are small) while the modern jeepneys have two doors on the right side of the vehicle. The back cab of the Jeepney is equipped with two long bench seats along the sides and the people seated closest to the driver are responsible for passing the fare of new passengers forward to the driver and the change back to the passenger. The start and end point of the jeepney route is often a jeepney terminal, where there is a queue system so only one jeepney plying a particular route is filled at a time, and where a person helps the driver to collect fares and fill the vehicles with people, usually to more than comfortable capacity.

Preferring to leave only when full and only stop for a crowd of potential passengers, riders can nonetheless disembark at any time; and while jeepneys ply fixed routes, these may be subject to change over time. New ones may need approval from a Philippine transport regulator. Jeepney stations do exist.

Another share taxi that is also common in the Philippines is the UV Express which uses Compact MPVs and vans as its form factor. These vehicles seat 10-18 people and charges additional 2 Philippine peso per kilometer (as of 2013).

 Thailand 

Literally "two rows" a songthaew or song thaew (Thai สองแถว, Lao: ສອງແຖວ [sɔ̌ːŋtʰíw]) is a passenger vehicle in Thailand and Laos adapted from a pick-up or a larger truck and used as a share taxi. They are also known as baht buses.

 Turkey and Northern Cyprus 

In Turkey and Turkish-controlled Northern Cyprus dolmuş (pronounced "dolmush") are share taxis that run on set routes within and between cities. Each of these cars or minibuses displays their particular route on signboards behind the windscreen.

Some cities may only allow dolmuş to pick up and disembark passengers at designated stops, and terminals also exist. The word derives from Turkish for "full" or "stuffed", as these share taxis depart from the terminal only when a sufficient number of passengers have boarded.  Visitors to Turkey have been surprised by the speed of dolmuş travel.

These share taxis are also found in Turkish-controlled, Northern Cyprus under the same name. Traveling intra and inter-city, the privately owned minibuses or aging Mercedes stretch limos are overseen by a governance institution; routes are leased and vehicles licensed. Passengers board anywhere along the route (you may have to get the driver to stop if he doesn't honk at you) as well as at termini and official stations. Dolmuş in Turkish-controlled, Northern Cyprus display their routes but don't follow timetables. Instead, they simply appear frequently.

 West Bank 
Share taxis are often called "ser-vees" (service taxi) in the West Bank. Minibuses are often used in lieu of vans. Ford Transit vans were often a popular vehicle for conversion, resulting in the generic trademark "Ford" and "Fordat"(pl) being used to describe minibuses of various makes, replacing aging Mercedes sedans.

Oceania
New Zealand
In New Zealand the first widespread motor vehicle services were shared taxi services termed service cars; a significant early provider was Aard, operating elongated Hudson Super Sixes. By 1930 there were 597 service cars. Aard was taken over by New Zealand Railways Road Services in 1928. Shared taxis in New Zealand nowadays are referred to as Shuttles or Shuttle vans (see below).

 New Zealand - Shuttle bus or van 

Shared buses or vans are available in many more developed countries connecting frequent destinations, charging a fixed fee per passenger. The most common case is a connection between an airport and central city locations. These services are often known as shuttles. Such services usually use smaller vehicles than normal buses, and often operate on demand. An air traveller can contact the shuttle company by telephone or Internet, not necessarily in advance; the company will ensure that a shuttle is provided without unreasonable delay. The shuttle will typically connect one airport with several large hotels, or addresses in a specified area of the city. The shuttle offers much of the convenience of a taxi, although taking longer, at a price which is significantly lower for one or two passengers. Scheduled services between an airport and a hotel, usually operated by the hotel, are also called shuttles.

In many cases the shuttle operator takes the risk of there not being enough passengers to make the trip profitable; in others there is a minimum charge when there are not enough passengers.

Usually there are regulations covering vehicles and drivers; for example in New Zealand under NZTA regulations, shuttles are only allowed to have up to eleven passenger seats, and the driver must have a passenger endorsement (P) on their drivers' licence.

Europe
Estonia
Share taxis in Estonia are mostly found in Tallinn, the capital. Called liinitakso, marsruuttakso, taksobuss or mikroautobuss depending on the language spoken, these minibuses run fixed routes and allow passengers to disembark at any time.

Greece
In Athens, Greece most taxis were share taxis, but since the country joined the EU this tradition started to disappear.

Former Soviet Union

Lithuania
In Lithuania, share taxis are called maršrutinis taksi.

Netherlands

Besides the conventional deeltaxi, there are treintaxis in some Dutch towns. Operated on behalf of the Netherlands Railways, they run to and from railway stations and the ride is shared with additional passengers picked up along the way. Tickets can be purchased at railway ticket offices or from the cabdriver, but treintaxis must be ordered by phone unless boarding at a railway station.

England
In 2018 Arriva launched shared taxi service Arriva Click in Liverpool and Sittingbourne and Kent Science Park in the United Kingdom.

Northern Ireland
In some towns in Northern Ireland, notably certain districts in Ballymena, Belfast, Derry and Newry, share taxi services operate using Hackney carriages and are called black taxis. These services developed during The Troubles as public bus services were often interrupted due to street rioting. Taxi collectives are closely linked with political groups – those operating in Catholic areas with Sinn Féin, those in Protestant areas with loyalist paramilitaries and their political wings.

Typically, fares approximate to those of Translink operated bus services on the same route.  Service frequencies are typically higher than on bus services, especially at peak times, although limited capacities mean that passengers living close to the termini may find it difficult to find a black taxi with seats available in the rush hour.

Switzerland
Major providers of mobility services as MOD Mobility On Demand and/or Collective Taxi in Switzerland are Telebus Kriens LU, Taxito, myBuxi, Kollibri by Swiss Postal Bus, and Pikmi by VBZ Verkehrsbetriebe Zurich ZH.

Most providers as TNC Transportation Network Companies run single-source mobility platforms for the service and/or are connected with multi-modal mobility platforms of Public Transit (= Collective Traffic) and city administration / community organization.

North America

Barbados

Most areas of Barbados are served by ZRs, which run in addition to the government-run bus service.

Dominican Republic

In the Dominican Republic, these privately owned vehicles run fixed routes with no designated stops, and the ride is shared with other passengers.

Foreign Affairs and International Trade Canada advises against traveling in Dominican Republic carros públicos because doing so makes passengers targets for robbery, and because the taxis are known to, "disregard traffic laws, often resulting in serious accidents involving injuries and sometimes death." The US Department of State also warns that using them is hazardous, as passengers often have their pockets picked, and are sometimes robbed by the drivers themselves.

HaitiTap taps, gaily painted buses or pick-up trucks, and publiques, usually older saloon cars, serve as share taxis in Haiti.Tap taps are privately owned and beautifully decorated. They follow fixed routes; won't leave until filled with passengers; and many feature wild colors, portraits of famous people, and intricate, hand-cut wooden window covers. Often they are painted with religious names or slogans. Riders can disembark at any point in the journey.My Haiti Picture for today : Tap-Tap  katianovetsaintlot.blogspot.com, February 9, 2010. Their name refers to "fast motion".

The publiques operate on fixed routes and pick up additional passengers all along the way.

While saying not to use any form of public transport in Haiti, the Foreign Affairs and International Trade Canada advises against tap tap travel especially. The US State Department also warns travelers not to use tap taps, "because they are often overloaded, mechanically unsound, and driven unsafely."

Saint Lucia
In Saint Lucia, waychehs are a name for minibus public transports using Toyota HiAce.

Canada

In Quebec, share taxis or jitneys are called taxis collectifs (in English "shared taxis") or transport collectif par taxi (which the STM translates in English as "taxibus") and are operated by subcontractors to the local transit authorities on fixed routes. Google translate renders "transport collectif par taxi" as "public transport by taxi".

In the case of the Montréal the fare is the same as local bus fare, but no cash and transfers are issued or accepted; in case of the STL only bus passes. The Réseau de transport de Longueuil accepts regular RTL tickets and all RTL and some Réseau de transport métropolitain TRAM passes.

Guatemala
In Guatemala, ruleteros, minibus share taxis, pick up and discharge passengers along major streets.

United StatesJitney is an American English term that originally referred to a vehicle for hire intermediate between a taxi and a bus. It is generally a small-capacity vehicle that follows a rough service route, but it can go slightly out of its way to pick up and drop off passengers. In many US cities (e.g. Pittsburgh and Detroit), the term jitney refers to an unlicensed taxi cab.

The name comes from an archaic, colloquial term for a five-cent piece in the US (the nickel). The common fare for the service when it first came into use was five cents, so the "five-cent cab" or "jitney cab" came to be known for the price charged.

In Rhode Island a jitney license plate is used for all public passenger buses, even for larger ones.

While jitneys became fairly common in many other countries, such as the Philippines, they first appeared in the US and Canada. The first US jitneys ran in 1914 in Los Angeles, California. By 1915, there were 62,000 nationwide. Local regulations, demanded by streetcar companies, killed the jitney in most places. By the end of 1916, only 6,000 jitneys remained. Similarly, in Vancouver, British Columbia, Canada, in the 1920s, jitneys competed directly with the streetcar monopoly operating along the same routes as the streetcars, but jitneys were charging lower fares. Operators were referred to as "jitney men." They were so successful that the city government banned them at the request of the streetcar operators.

Since the 1973 oil crisis (as well as the mid-20th-century decline in transit service), jitneys have reappeared in some areas of the US, particularly in inner city areas once served by streetcars and private buses. An increase in bus fares usually leads to a significant rise in jitney usage. Liberalization of jitneys is often encouraged by libertarian urban economists, such as University of Chicago's Richard Epstein, Rutgers' James Dunn, and USC's Peter Gordon, as a more "market-friendly" alternative to public transportation. Concerns over fares, insurance liabilities, and passenger safety have kept legislative support for jitneys decidedly tepid. Nevertheless, in New York City and northern New Jersey, jitneys (known as "dollar vans" because of their original price) are regulated.

Miami has the country's most comprehensive jitney network, due to Caribbean influence. In Atlanta jitneys run along Buford Highway.

In Atlantic City the ACJA operates a jitney service that travels the main strip of casinos. One of the routes also services the new cluster of casinos west of Atlantic City proper.

In 2009, the Houston Waves, Houston's first jitney service in 17 years, started running. It has expanded into a network of buses operating within Loop 610 and to all special event venues in Houston.

 Latin America 
In Puerto Rico, “carros públicos” (literally "public cars") are share taxis. Carros Publicos set routes with several passengers sharing the ride and others picked up throughout the journey.

The industry is regulated by the Puerto Rico Public Service Commission.

While these cars do travel inter-city, they may not be available for longer, cross-island travel. Stations may exist in cities, and Puerto Rican carros públicos may congregate in specific places around town.

 Mexico 

Along with traditional bus and minibus routes in some areas that the regular size buses couldn't fit due to the road and street height and width with small size. but they are regulated in standard minibuses fare depending the state and city of the country.

South America
ArgentinaColectivos operated as share taxis from the late 1920s until the 1950s in Buenos Aires, Argentina when they were integrated into the public transportation system. Vehicles still known as colectivos operate throughout the country, but have long been indistinguishable from buses.

Chile, Peru and Guatemala

Often share taxi routes in Mexico are ad hoc arrangements to fill in gaps in regular public transportation, and many operate inter-city as well as local routes. In many rural areas, they are the only public transportation.

In some cases truck/taxi combination vehicles have evolved to transport light goods as well as passengers. Heavily used share taxi routes often evolve into regulated microbus public transit routes, as has occurred in Mexico City and in Lima.Taxis colectivos are also found in Perú, Chile, Guatemala, and Argentina, where they are most commonly referred to simply as colectivos'', although in some places they have become essentially standard buses.

Modern technology-based services

Paratransit
Modern Paratransit services, also known as demand responsive transport systems in the UK, can provide shared transport services in situations where scheduled services are not viable. Traditionally these services had to be booked a day in advance, but are becoming increasingly responsive using modern communications systems with a central booking system accessed by phone or internet and instant communications with GPS tracked vehicles. Unlike scheduled services the vehicles need not operate on fixed routes of timetables, although they do often have constrained routes.

Commercial shared taxis booking services

Some newer taxi share systems now use internet and mobile phone communications for booking and scheduling purposes, with the actual service provided by normal hackney carriage or Private Hire vehicles. Prospective passengers make bookings and supply destination details using SMS or mobile apps to a central server which aggregates these travel requests and creates packages of trips which are then communicated to drivers.

Commercially operated airport shuttle buses
There are many operators of airport shuttle services between Airports and Hotels around the world that operate on flexible routing and timing to offer a service that is both cheaper than a sole-occupancy taxi and also often more convenient that other forms of public transport. The requirement to carry luggage offers an added incentive to use such services over scheduled transport which will normally require a walk from the drop-off location to the final destination. Services from these operators are starting to spread from airports to railway stations and to other locations.

Demand responsive transport

Some operators and/or governments around the world are now offering demand-based shared transport to residents in community with low ridership numbers, which could help maintain the existence of public transport. Operations are predefined according to bookings.

See also 
 Dollar van
 Dolmuş
 Marshrutka
 Nanny van
 Pesero
 Public light bus (Hong Kong)

Citations

Cited works

External links 
 

 
Bus terminology
Public transport by mode
Public transport in Turkey
Sustainable transport
Transport in Africa
Transport in Israel